Corpus Linguistics and Linguistic Theory is a peer-reviewed academic journal that publishes articles and book reviews on corpus linguistics, with a focus on corpus-linguistic findings and their relevance to linguistic theory. It is published by de Gruyter Mouton and the editor-in-chief is Stefanie Wulff (University of Florida).

External links 
 

Publications established in 2005
English-language journals
Biannual journals
De Gruyter academic journals
Corpus linguistics journals